Pierson or Piersons may refer to:

Places 
Pierson, Florida
Pierson, Iowa
Pierson, Manitoba
Pierson, Michigan
Pierson College of Yale University
Pierson Creek, a stream in Iowa
Piersons Lake, a lake in Minnesota

Other uses 
Pierson (surname)

See also
Peirson, given name and surname
Pearson (disambiguation)